Pontian District is a district located in southwest part of the Malaysian state of Johor. It borders Batu Pahat and Kluang Districts to the north and Kulai and Johor Bahru Districts to the east.

Etymology
The name of Pontian was derived from the Malay word “” which means a stop, a reference to the sailors travelling to and from Singapore or Malacca stopping at Pontian Besar River for shelter from the rough waters in the Strait of Malacca.

Administrative divisions

Pontian District is divided into 11 mukims, which are:
 Api-Api
 Ayer Baloi
 Ayer Masin
 Benut
 Jeram Batu
 Pengkalan Raja
 Pontian
 Rimba Terjun
 Serkat
 Sungai Karang
 Sungai Pinggan

Federal Parliament and State Assembly Seats 

List of Pontian district representatives in the Federal Parliament (Dewan Rakyat): 

List of Pontian district representatives in the State Legislative Assembly (Dewan Undangan Negeri):

Demographics

In 2000, the annual population growth of Pontian District was 2.36%.

Economy

The main economic activities in the district are agriculture, construction, ecotourism, fishery and marine and food processing industries. The former includes pineapple farms and palm oil plantations, which are mainly focused in the town of Pekan Nanas.

Transportation

Road
The district is accessible by bus from Larkin Sentral (Mybas Johor- T50, Maju - 96) in Johor Bahru.

Sea
There are regularly scheduled ferries connecting fishing village Kukup in Serkat Mukim with Tanjung Balai Karimun in Riau Islands, Indonesia.

References

External links 

 Official Portal of Pontian District Council